Lviv urban territorial hromada is a hromada (municipality) in Ukraine's Lviv Oblast, in Lviv Raion. The hromada's administrative centre is the city of Lviv.

Until 18 July 2020, the hromada belonged to the city of Lviv which was incorporated as a city of oblast significance and the center of Lviv Municipality. The municipality was abolished in July 2020 as part of the administrative reform of Ukraine, which reduced the number of raions of Lviv Oblast to seven. The area of Lviv Municipality was merged into the newly established Lviv Raion.

Settlements 
The Lviv urban hromada contains three cities (Lviv, Vynnyky, and Dubliany), two urban-type settlements (Briukhovychi and Rudne), and fifteen villages:

 Velyki Hrybovychi
 
 
 Zavadiv
 
 Zashkiv
 
 
 Malekhiv
 Mali Hrybovychi
 
 Pidbirtsi
 
 
 Sytykhiv

References 

2020 establishments in Ukraine
Hromadas of Lviv Oblast